Ichneutica insignis is a moth of the family Noctuidae. It is endemic to New Zealand. This species is found throughout New Zealand, although it appears to be scarce in inland sites of tussock grasslands. The adults are on the wing throughout the year. It is a variable species and as such can be easily confused with I. skelloni and I. plena. The larvae of this species have been recorded as feeding on Trifolium pratense.

Taxonomy 
This species was first scientifically described by Francis Walker in 1865 using a specimen collected by T. R. Oxley. Although the original scientific description states the specimen originated in Auckland, the correct type locality is in Nelson. Walker originally named the species Euplexia insignis. The lectotype specimen is held at the Natural History Museum, London. In 1988 J. S. Dugdale, in his catalogue of New Zealand Lepidoptera, placed this species within the Graphania genus. In 2019 Robert Hoare undertook a major review of New Zealand Noctuidae species. During this review the genus Ichneutica was greatly expanded and the genus Graphania was subsumed into that genus as a synonym. As a result of this review, this species is now known as Ichneutica insignis.

Description 

George Hudson describes the eggs of this species as follows:

Larvae start their lives coloured pale brown with numerous black warts emitting black bristles. After about twelve days the larvae turn a pale green and after moulting, lateral and subdorsal lines begin to appear.

Hudson describes the fully mature larva of this species is as follows:

Walker described the adults of this species as follows:
I. insignis is variable in appearance and as a result is difficult to distinguish from its close relatives I. skelloni and I. plena. The pectinations on the antennae of the male I. insignis are longer than those on I. skelloni. The dorsum of the forewings of some specimens of I. insignis often has a "distinct whitish suffusion" which is considered diagnostic. This feature is lacking in I. plena specimens and although a similar pale marking may also occur in I. skelloni specimens the colour is not whitish.

Distribution 
This species can be found throughout New Zealand.

Habitat 
Although this species can be found in a variety of habitats through out the country it is scarce or absent from inland sites of tussock grassland.

Behaviour 
Adults of this species can be found on the wing throughout the year. The adults moths are attracted to light. The sex pheromones used by I. insignis consist of combinations of tetradecenyl and dodecenyl acetates or alcohols.

Life cycle and host species 
The larvae of this species emerge from eggs after about two weeks. Larvae of I. insignis can feed on various plants but have been recorded as feeding on Trifolium pratense.

References

Hadeninae
Moths of New Zealand
Endemic fauna of New Zealand
Moths described in 1865
Taxa named by Francis Walker (entomologist)
Endemic moths of New Zealand